The Constitution (Thirtieth Amendment) Act, 2017 was a proposed amendment to the Constitution of Pakistan seeking to create seats for the Federally Administered Tribal Areas in the Khyber Pakhtunkhwa Assembly and establish a new judicial system in the tribal belt. The amendment would have added new provisions to the Constitution to create room for FATA lawmakers in the Khyber Pakhtunkhwa Assembly after the merger of FATA and Khyber Pakhtunkhwa. The amendment was introduced to the National Assembly of Pakistan alongside the Tribal Areas Rewaj Act.

It was never adopted and never officially became part of the constitution. Some of these provisions were included in Twenty-fifth Amendment to the Constitution of Pakistan.

References

Amendments to the Constitution of Pakistan
2017 in Pakistani law
Acts of the Parliament of Pakistan